Little Belt National Forest was established as the Little Belt Forest Reserve by the U.S. Forest Service in Montana on October 3, 1905 with  after a name change from Little Belt Mountains Forest Reserve, which was established on August 16, 1902 with .  It became a National Forest on March 4, 1907. On July 1, 1908 the entire forest was combined with Highwood Mountains, Snowy Mountains and Little Rockies National Forests to establish Jefferson National Forest and the name was discontinued.  The lands are included in Lewis and Clark National Forest.

The forest is part of the Jefferson Division of Lewis and Clark National Forest. The Little Belt Mountains are included in the unit, primarily in Meagher, Cascade, Judith Basin and Wheatland Counties.

See also
 List of forests in Montana

References

External links
Lewis and Clark National Forest
Forest History Society
Listing of the National Forests of the United States and Their Dates (from the Forest History Society website) Text from Davis, Richard C., ed. Encyclopedia of American Forest and Conservation History. New York: Macmillan Publishing Company for the Forest History Society, 1983. Vol. II, pp. 743-788.

Former National Forests of Montana
Protected areas of Cascade County, Montana
Protected areas of Judith Basin County, Montana
Protected areas of Wheatland County, Montana
Protected areas of Meagher County, Montana
1905 establishments in Montana
Protected areas established in 1905
1908 disestablishments in Montana
Protected areas disestablished in 1908